The Derby North by-election was held on 17 April 1962 after the death of the incumbent Labour MP, Clifford Wilcock.  It was won by the Labour candidate Niall MacDermot.

References

By-elections to the Parliament of the United Kingdom in Derbyshire constituencies
1962 elections in the United Kingdom
1962 in England
1960s in Derbyshire